Coleophora lacera is a moth of the family Coleophoridae. It is found in southern Russia.

References

lacera
Moths described in 1993
Moths of Europe